Following is a list of senators of Gironde, people who have represented the department of Gironde in the Senate of France.

Third Republic

Senators for Gironde under the French Third Republic were:

 Charles de Pelleport-Burete (1876-1879)
 Louis Béhic (1876–1879)
 Louis Hubert-Delisle (1876–1879)
 Raoul Duval (1876–1879)
 Pierre Issartier (1879–1887)
 Jean Callen (1879–1888)
 Henri de Lur-Saluces (1879–1891)
 Bernard Dupouy  de 1879–1897)
 Armand Caduc (1885–1902)
 André Lavertujon (1887–1897)
 Ludovic Trarieux (1888–1904)
 Louis Obissier (1897–1911)
 David Raynal (1897-1903) died in office
 Albert Thounens (1903-1920)
 Ernest Monis (1891–1920)
 Albert Decrais (1903–1915)
 Marcel Courrégelongue (1904–1924)
 Guillaume Chastenet de Castaing (1912–1933)
 Eugène Buhan (1920–1933)
 Louis David (1920–1924)
 Marcel Vayssiere (1920-1922) died in office
 Charles Chaumet (1923–1932)
 Fernand Faure (1924–1929)
 Armand Calmel (1924–1941)
 Joseph Capus (1930–1941)
 René Caillier (1932–1941)
 Jean Odin (1933-1941)
 Georges Portmann (1933-1941)

Fourth Republic

Senators for Gironde under the French Fourth Republic were:

 René Duhourquet (1946–1948)
 François Leuret (1946–1948)
 Maxime Teyssandier (1946–1948)
 Robert Brettes (1946–1959)
 Jean Sourbet (7–19 November 1948)
 Lucien de Gracia (1948–1951)
 Jean Durand (1948–1955)
 Max Monichon (1948–1959)
 Georges Milh (1951–1955)
 Marc Pauzet (1955–1959)
 Georges Portmann (1955–1959)

Fifth Republic 
Former senators for Gironde under the French Fifth Republic were:

As of January 2018 the senators were:

References

Sources

 
Gironde